Michael Louis Kaczmarek (born October 31, 1951) is a former American football linebacker who played for the Baltimore Colts in 1973. He played college football at Southern Illinois University.

References 

1951 births
Living people
American football linebackers
Southern Illinois Salukis football players
Baltimore Colts players